In ancient Greek literature, an eidolon ('image, idol, double, apparition, phantom, ghost'; plural: eidola or  eidolons) is a spirit-image of a living or dead person; a shade or phantom look-alike of the human form.

Literary use
The concept of Helen of Troy's eidolon was explored both by Homer and Euripides. Homer uses the concept as a free-standing idea that gives Helen life after death. Euripides entangles it with the idea of kleos, the one being the product of the other. Both Euripides and Stesichorus, in their works concerning the Trojan Horse, use the concept of the eidolon to claim that Helen was never physically present in the city at all.

The concept of the eidola of the dead has been explored in literature regarding Penelope, who in later works was constantly laboring against the eidola of Clytemnestra and later of Helen herself. Homer's use of eidola also extends to the Odyssey where, after the death of the suitors of Penelope, Theoclymenus notes that he sees the doorway of the court filled with them.

In Dream-Land, an 1844 poem by Edgar Allan Poe, an Eidolon rules over a realm haunted by "ill angels only" and reserved for the ones whose "woes are legion" and who "walk in shadow".

Walt Whitman's poem by the same name in 1876 used a much broader understanding of the term, expanded and detailed in the poem. In Whitman's use of the term we can see the use broaden to include the concept of an oversoul composed of the individual souls of all life and expanding to include the Earth itself and the hierarchy of the planets, Sun, stars and galaxy.

In Theosophy, the astral double or perispirit or kamarupa after death, before its disintegration, is identified with the eidolon.

In the Italian Disney comic book PKNA, there is a character named Odin Eidolon who is a body double for the character One.

See also 
 Doppelgänger
 Etiäinen
 Fetch (folklore)
 Vardøger

References 

Love
Ancient Greek religion
Theosophical philosophical concepts